Where Is My Friend's Home (Korean: 내 친구의 집은 어디인가, Romanization:  Nae chingue jibeun eodinga) is a South Korean reality television-travel show, part of JTBC's Saturday night lineup. The show's first season aired from February 7, 2015, to April 29, 2016.

Episodes

The show visits various countries of cast and former cast of Non-Summit, with occasional friends and guests added.

References

External links
  

Episodes
Lists of variety television series episodes
Lists of South Korean television series episodes